Hernán Padilla Ramírez (born May 5, 1938) is a retired physician and former two-term Mayor of San Juan, Puerto Rico.

Biography 
After training as a nephrologist, he entered private practice and joined the military with the Puerto Rico National Guard and the U.S. Army Reserve in Fort Meade Maryland. He was sent to active duty during the Gulf War and assigned to Walter Reed Army Medical Center.  In 1967, he became politically active, participating in the pro-statehood campaign leading to the July 27 political status plebiscite, as a leader of Estadistas Unidos (Statehooders United), a non-partisan group founded by long-time Statehood Republican Party gubernatorial candidate Luis A. Ferré.  On August 20, 1967, at the assembly in Carolina, Puerto Rico at which the organization was dissolved, Padilla and other party leaders proposed the creation of a new political party that would eventually be known as the New Progressive Party (NPP) or Partido Nuevo Progresista (PNP) in Spanish.

In January, 1969 and after the NPP's electoral triumph and his own election as a state representative, in spite of being a freshman, he was selected as House Majority Leader for the 1969-1973 term.  After the NPP's defeat in 1972 and his own reelection, he served as Minority Whip until 1977. In 1976, he won the NPP nomination for mayor of San Juan after a three-way competition with attorney Baltasar Corrada del Río and Senator Sila Nazario, and was elected to the post in November of that year, succeeding newly elected Governor Carlos Romero Barceló and Carlos S. Quirós who served a days-long stint as mayor following Romero's swearing-in as governor and the official beginning of the 1977-1981 term.  His term as mayor was marked by a major expansion of sports and community facilities and the first attempt to wrestle with San Juan's looming solid waste crisis.  He also served as President of the U.S. Conference of Mayors, being the first Hispanic in that position. Hernan Padilla built the San Juan's Municipal Tower in Hato Rey, San Juan's Central Park, the Pedrin Zorilla Coliseum, Paseo de Diego, and others installations. He also created San Juan's Municipal police department.

Reelected as mayor in 1980, Padilla became increasingly dissatisfied with Romero and the incumbent governor's capacity to lead the party to another victory in 1984 after barely winning reelection by less than one-half of one percent margin in 1980.  The tensions between both leaders led to Padilla splitting from the NPP and creating the Puerto Rican Renewal Party (PRP), and aspiring for governor under the PRP banner. Pro-statehood votes in 1984 were split between the PRP and the NPP, which renominated Romero, resulting in the Popular Democratic Party return to power, through the election to an unprecedented non-consecutive second term, of Rafael Hernández Colón as governor.

After 1984, he returned to medical practice as a nephrologist, serving with the National Capital Area for Kaiser Permanente. In 1991 he was the subject of one television advertisement by Kaiser that was regularly aired across the United States.

Padilla channelled his post-1984 political energies through national initiatives, serving as chairman for the US Council for Puerto Rico Statehood (USCPRS).  He has rejoined the NPP and was the surprise keynote speaker at the party's August 2010 convention in Río Grande, Puerto Rico, at the invitation of party president, Gov. Luis Fortuño, who considers Padilla one of his mentors.

Padilla now lives in Miramar, Florida. He is a member of Fraternidad Fi Sigma Alfa since 1956.

In 2009, he was appointed to represent the Puerto Rico House of Representatives on the five-member board of directors of the Puerto Rico Public-Private Partnerships Authority that regulates public-private partnerships in Puerto Rico.

Dr. Padilla writes a weekly column in the largest circulation newspaper in Puerto Rico, El Nuevo Dia, about current political, ideological, economic and administrative issues in Puerto Rico. He also writes a column for El Sentinel, a Spanish weekly publication of the Sun Sentinel in South Florida. His columns can be accessed at his blog: http://blog.hernanpadilla.com.

References

|-

|-

1938 births
Living people
Mayors of places in Puerto Rico
Mayors of San Juan, Puerto Rico
Puerto Rican nephrologists
National Guard (United States) officers
New Progressive Party members of the House of Representatives of Puerto Rico
People from Mayagüez, Puerto Rico
People from Miramar, Florida
Puerto Rican military officers
United States Army reservists
Presidents of the United States Conference of Mayors